The 2008 Ballon d'Or, given to the best football player in the world as judged by an international panel of sports journalists, was awarded on 2 December 2008. Cristiano Ronaldo won the award, being his first of five. His win also began a 10-year dominance of the award between him and Lionel Messi  — which eventually led to an intense rivalry between the two. Both players had won five Ballon d'Or awards before the dominance was ended in 2018.

Rankingsmessi leading the ranking since 2012 when on his prime

References

External links
 France Football Official Ballon d'Or page

2008–09 in European football
2008